Pontsticill railway station (historically Pontsticill Junction railway station) is an intermediate station on the Brecon Mountain Railway at Pontsticill, in the historic Welsh county of Brecknockshire, now Merthyr Tydfil County Borough.

The station was previously the junction at which the Brecon and Merthyr Tydfil Railway line from Torpantau in the North split to serve the Brecon & Merthyr Railway main line and the Merthyr Tydfil branch. Today it is no longer a junction.

The station opened in 1863. It was closed for 17 years from January 1963 to June 1980.

History

Brecon and Merthyr Tydfil Junction Railway

The Brecon and Merthyr Tydfil Junction Railway obtained an Act of Parliament on 1 August 1859 to construct a line between Talybont and Pant. Train services between Brecon and Pant officially began on 23 April 1863 but two trains per day ran from 19 March 1863. This line, running south from Pontsticill to Pant, is the route still operated by the Brecon Mountain Railway.

Pontsticill became a junction in 1868, with the opening of a second southerly line, running down a steep gradient to Morlais, where it connected with the London and North Western Railway line between Dowlais and Merthyr Tydfil, as part of a line sharing arrangement. The line from Pontsticill to Morlais Junction is disused, and the track lifted.

Great Western Railway

The B&MR became part of the Great Western Railway during the Grouping of 1923. The GWR became the operator of Pontsticill Junction, maintaining services on all lines. The station passed into British Railways ownership with the nationalisation of the railways. The station closed on 31 December 1962. Freight services continued through the station until 1964.

Brecon Mountain Railway
Planning for the proposed Brecon Mountain Railway had commenced less than ten years after the closure of Pontsticill Junction, and construction work started in 1978, followed by the grant of a Light Railway Order in 1980. Track laying between Pant and Pontsticill took place from 1979 to 1980.

At Pontsticill the signal box was derelict, and the station house had been in temporary use as a sheep shelter. Both buildings were renovated. The original waiting room was converted into an engineers' workshop, and a rolling stock storage shed was built. Seven bridges were repaired or replaced between Pant and Pontsticill.

Pontsticill station re-opened to passengers in June 1980. Pontsticill was the terminus of the re-opened line from 1980 to 1994; from 1995 the line was further re-opened northwards.

The station today
One platform is in use for passenger trains, with passenger facilities including a cafeteria and toilets. The original signal box and station house are on the eastern side of the station site.

The original stone waiting room, used as a temporary workshop for several years from 1980, has since been converted and extended to form a small steam museum with a collection of stationary steam engines, displays, artefacts, and 3 small working steam locomotives.

The stock storage sheds remain in place, south of the station. Although these sheds and the temporary workshop, were all vital in the early years of restoration, the BMR today has more extensive sheds, together with new workshops, at Pant station.

References

Further reading

External links
Coflein entry
Railway website

Disused railway stations in Merthyr Tydfil County Borough
Former Brecon and Merthyr Tydfil Junction Railway stations
Railway stations in Great Britain opened in 1863
Railway stations in Great Britain closed in 1962
Railway stations in Great Britain opened in 1980